Avdakt is a Russian Christian male first name. It is possibly derived from the Serbian Muslim word Abdaga (Abdul-aga), meaning master's slave, slave of an elder relative. Its colloquial form is Avda.

"Avdakt" is also a colloquial form of the male first name Adavkt.

References

Notes

Sources
А. В. Суперанская (A. V. Superanskaya). "Словарь русских имён" (Dictionary of Russian Names). Издательство Эксмо. Москва, 2005.